John Telemachus Bearden (August 18, 1826 – March 9, 1900) was an American politician. He was a Democratic member of the Arkansas House of Representatives.

References

1900 deaths
Speakers of the Arkansas House of Representatives
Democratic Party members of the Arkansas House of Representatives
1826 births
Arkansas lawyers
People from Ouachita County, Arkansas
Politicians from Knoxville, Tennessee
19th-century American politicians
19th-century American lawyers